Lynfield College is a secondary education provider in Lynfield, Auckland, New Zealand. It celebrated its 50th anniversary in 2008.

The Principal of Lynfield College is Ms Cath Knell.

The school practices NCEA for assessments and examinations, and has high achievement rates compared to the national average.

History
Lynfield College opened its doors for the first time in 1958. Originally planned to be called Blockhouse Bay High School, it was renamed Lynfield by parents and teachers associated with the school. The name Lynfield was taken from the poultry farm run by Sir Alfre Bankart, that was formerly opposite the school's main entrance.

Gilletta Road in Lynfield was named after Bankheart's wife's maiden name. Another Owner of the Property was Mr Irvine. He diversified from farming poultry to founding the giant baking and pastry firm Irvines Bakery.

The  on which the school now stands has seen a variety of activities – gum-digging, dairy farming, pig and poultry farming. In 1900 Messes Cooper and  Mr Edwards began commercial strawberry growing. In 1911, Mr Cooper married and divided the land, keeping the half that bordered Boundary Road and Mr Edwards the other half which exited onto White Swan Road. In the 1950s, owners of the land sold portions to make way for Auckland's 20th Secondary School (to be possibly named Roskill South High School).There is a plough on the school's crest, to symbolise the use of the land it is located on as previously being a strawberry field.

Principals
 Des Thurston 1958–1972
 Ian Hayter 1972–1984
 Jim Sinclair 1985–2002
 Steve Bovaird 2002–2017
 Cath Knell 2017–present

Notable alumni

 Daniel Bedingfield – singer
 Natasha Bedingfield – singer
 Trent Bray – swimmer
 Dean Booth – paralympic swimmer
 Rita Fatialofa-Paloto – netball and softball player
 Beatrice Faumuina – athlete
 Sam Kaleta – rugby union player
 Ralph Norris – businessman
 Henry Perenara – rugby league player and referee
 Lisa Reihana – artist
 Helen Winkelmann – Current Chief Justice

Notes

Secondary schools in Auckland
Educational institutions established in 1958
1958 establishments in New Zealand